Fareed Express is a passenger train operated daily by Pakistan Railways between Karachi and Lahore. The train named after Baba Fareed Shakar Ganj, a famous Sufi saint and Punjabi poet who lived in Pakpattan between 1173–1266.

History
On 21 August 2016, the Fareed Express train was privatized and outsourced to Syed Jamil & Company which joined hands with Pakistan Railway to operate the train in a private-public venture. The trains have been be equipped with internet service, AC services and catering.

Route
 Karachi City–Lodhran Junction via Karachi–Peshawar Railway Line
 Lodhran Junction–Raiwind Junction via Lodhran–Raiwind Branch Line
 Raiwind Junction–Lahore Junction via Karachi–Peshawar Railway Line

Station stops

Equipment
The train has AC Standard and Economy class accommodations.

Incidents
 Karachi rail crash, 3 November 2016

References

Named passenger trains of Pakistan
Passenger trains in Pakistan